European route E35 is a European route that runs from Amsterdam, Netherlands, in northwestern Europe, to Rome, Italy in the south of the continent. The road heads through Germany and Switzerland before reaching Italy.

Route description 

: Amsterdam
: Amsterdam - Utrecht
: Utrecht - Arnhem - Zevenaar

: Emmerich am Rhein - Duisburg  - Köln - Limburg a. d. Lahn - Frankfurt am Main
: Frankfurt am Main - Darmstadt - Mannheim (Towards ) - Karlsruhe (Start of Concurrency with ) - Offenburg, End of Concurrency with ) - Weil am Rhein

: Basel (Start of Concurrency with ) - Olten (End of Concurrency with ) - Luzern - Altdorf - Bellinzona - Lugano - Chiasso

: Como - Lainate
: Lainate - Milan
: Milan
: Milan - Piacenza - Parma - Modena (Start of Concurrency with ) - Bologna (End of Concurrency with ) - Sasso Marconi
: Sasso Marconi - Barberino di Mugello
: Barberino di Mugello - Firenze - Arezzo - Orte (Start of Concurrency with ) - Fiano Romano (End of Concurrency with )
: Fiano Romano - Roma (Towards )

History

Major intersections 
Principal Cities, North to South:

Amsterdam (A2)
Utrecht (A2, A12)
Ede (A12)
Arnhem (A12)

Duisburg (A3)
Düsseldorf (A3)
Cologne (A3)
Bonn (A3)
Wiesbaden (A3)
Frankfurt am Main (A3)
Darmstadt (A67, A5)
Bensheim (A5)
Heidelberg (A5)
Karlsruhe (A5)
Baden-Baden (A5)
Freiburg im Breisgau (A5)

Basel (A2)
Luzern (A2)
Altdorf (A2)
Bellinzona (A2)
Lugano (A2)
Chiasso (A2)

Como (A9)
Milan (A9, A8, A50, A1)
Piacenza (A1)
Parma (A1)
Modena (A1)
Bologna (A1)
Florence (A1)
Arezzo (A1)
Orvieto (A1)
Rome (A1dir)

Tunnels:
St. Gotthard Tunnel, Switzerland

See also

References

External links 
 UN Economic Commission for Europe: Overall Map of E-road Network (2007)

 
35
E035
E035
E035
E035
E035
E035